Derrick Vivian "Des" Hamilton (born 15 August 1976) is an English former professional footballer and was assistant manager of Eccleshill United.

As a player he played as a midfielder from 1994 to 2010. He started his career with his hometown club Bradford City, making his debut at the age of 17. He helped Bradford win promotion to the First Division by scoring in the 1996 Football League Second Division play-off Final. He left Bradford less than a year later for a club record £2m having played more than 100 career games. He instead signed for Newcastle United, for whom he played in both the UEFA Champions League and UEFA Cup. However, he was restricted to just 12 league games in five seasons and spent time on loan with four other clubs. He moved on to Cardiff City and Grimsby Town, but after a brief spell at Barnet for whom he never played, he retired from professional football age of 27. He later went on to spend five years with Non-League side Campion. He won one England under-21 cap.

Playing career

Bradford City
Born in Bradford, Hamilton came through the youth ranks at Bradford City as a promising youngster. He made his debut, aged 17, in the league at home to Barnet on 3 May 1994 scoring in a 2–1 win. He was a main feature in the team for the following two seasons and helped City to promotion from Division Two in 1995–96. He scored in the play-off semi-finals at Blackpool as City turned round a 2–0 first leg deficit into a 3–2 aggregate win before scoring the club's first goal at Wembley Stadium in the 2–0 play-off final victory over Notts County.

City struggled to adapt to life in Division One the following season but Hamilton was attracting the scouts to Valley Parade. He eventually signed for Newcastle United before the March transfer window for £2m. It is still a club record fee received by Bradford, jointly shared by Andy O'Brien who also left for Newcastle four years later.

During his time with Bradford, Hamilton won a call-up to the Football League XI to play against a Serie B select side.

Newcastle United
Hamilton was manager Kenny Dalglish's first major signing at Newcastle, having fought off competition from Middlesbrough. Hamilton was injured at the time of his arrival and his full debut was further delayed after he damaged ankle ligaments in a pre-season friendly with Italian-side Juventus. Hamilton eventually made his debut in a League Cup 2–0 victory over Hull City when he scored the opening goal and received a call-up for the England under 21 side against Portugal in May 1997. In November 1997, he made his European debut, against Spanish side FC Barcelona, which finished in a 1–0 defeat. However, Hamilton struggled to break into the first team at Newcastle United and, along with Rob Lee and Alessandro Pistone, was not even given a squad number for the 1999–2000 season.

Instead Hamilton spent loan spells at Sheffield United, Huddersfield Town, Norwich City and twice at Tranmere Rovers in October 2000. His first spell at Tranmere was cut short after he injured himself in a League Cup tie, which ruled him out for six weeks. Hamilton was one of four players released by Newcastle at the end of the 2000–01 season.

Cardiff City
He left St James' Park in 2001 for Cardiff City. His new manager Alan Cork praised Hamilton, and fellow new signings Spencer Prior and Graham Kavanagh for their experience and immediately blending into the squad. Hamilton made an early impression in two pre-season friendlies, but his first season at Cardiff was marred by a number of injuries; by March, he was ruled out for the final two months of the campaign after he twisted his knee in a semi-final victory against Wrexham in the FAW Premier Cup.

Grimsby Town and move to Barnet
In the summer of 2003, Hamilton joined Grimsby Town and immediately joined his new team on tour in Ibiza. Hamilton's career with Grimsby suffered an early setback when he was sent off in a League Cup against Doncaster Rovers; Hamilton apologised after his red card led to Grimsby's surprise exit. He left Grimsby in March 2004 after his contract was terminated by mutual consent. He finished his professional career with Barnet. However, he did not play a game with the Bees.

Campion
Hamilton abruptly retired from professional football in 2004 at the age of 27. He returned home to Bradford to work where he also played amateur football. In May 2007, he scored in the final of the West Riding County FA Challenge Cup to give his Campion side a 2–1 victory over Golcar.

Coaching career
In 2017 he became the assistant manager of Eccleshill United.

Playing statistics

A.  In the 1997–98 season, Hamilton played two games in the UEFA Champions League for Newcastle United.
B.  In the 1999–2000 season, Hamilton played one games in the UEFA Cup for Newcastle United.
C.  Hamilton played four games in the Football League Trophy for Cardiff City.
D.  Hamilton played one game in the Football League Trophy for Grimsby Town.

References

External links

Career information at ex-canaries.co.uk

1976 births
Living people
English footballers
England under-21 international footballers
Bradford City A.F.C. players
Newcastle United F.C. players
Norwich City F.C. players
Tranmere Rovers F.C. players
Cardiff City F.C. players
Sheffield United F.C. players
Huddersfield Town A.F.C. players
Grimsby Town F.C. players
Barnet F.C. players
Campion A.F.C. players
English Football League players
Premier League players
Black British sportsmen
Footballers from Bradford
Association football midfielders